The South Temple Historic District is a  historic district that was the first to be listed in the Salt Lake City Register in 1976, and was listed on the National Register of Historic Places in 1982.

It includes 106 contributing buildings, including the Governor's Mansion and the Salt Lake Masonic Temple.

It includes:
Enos Wall Mansion, Classical Revival, designed by Richard K.A. Kletting
Emanuel Kahn House, Queen Anne, separately-NRHP-listed 
Cathedral of the Madeleine, 319 East South Temple, Victorian Romanesque, designed by C.M. Neuhausen
Kearns Mansion, Chateauesque, designed by Carl M. Neuhausen
Gothic Revival: First Presbyterian Church Walter E. Ware
Keith-Brown Mansion, Frederick A. Hale
Shingle Style: Markland House, Frederick A. Hale
Renaissance Revival: Alta Club, Fred A. Hale
Prairie Style: Ladies Literary Club, Ware and Treganza
Egyptian Revival: Masonic Temple, Scott and Welch
Colonial Revival: Terry House, Henry Ives Cobb

References

External links

Buildings and structures in Salt Lake City
Commercial buildings on the National Register of Historic Places in Utah
Government buildings on the National Register of Historic Places in Utah
Historic districts on the National Register of Historic Places in Utah
National Register of Historic Places in Salt Lake City
Residential buildings on the National Register of Historic Places in Utah